The Léopard was a 28-gun small ship of the line of the French Royal Navy, constructed by the Dutch shipwright Jan Gron (usually called Jean de Werth in French) at the new state dockyard at Île d'Indret near Nantes. She and her sister Tigre were two-deckers, but with only a few guns on the upper deck.

In April 1651 her crew mutinied and handed the ship over to the Spanish at San Lucar.

Sources and references 

Nomenclature des Vaisseaux de Louis XIII et de la régence d'Anne d'Autriche, 1610 a 1661. Alain Demerliac (Editions Omega, Nice – 2004).
The Sun King's Vessels (2015) - Jean-Claude Lemineur; English translation by François Fougerat. Editions ANCRE.  
Winfield, Rif and Roberts, Stephen (2017) French Warships in the Age of Sail 1626-1786: Design, Construction, Careers and Fates. Seaforth Publishing. . 

 Vaisseaux de Ligne Français de 1682 à 1780 1

Ships of the line of the French Navy
1640s ships